Mari Ellis Dunning (born 15 July 1993) is a Welsh writer based in Aberystwyth. Her debut poetry collection Salacia was shortlisted for the Wales Book of the Year in 2019. She has also published a children's book.

Early life 
Mari Ellis Dunning was born on 15 July 1993. She is a University of Aberystwyth alum, having studied for an MA in Creative Writing there.

Career 
Dunning's first solo publication was a children's book called Percy the Pom Pom Bear, published simultaneously in Welsh and English. The book was launched on 23 April 2016 at the Abergavenny Writing Festival. Later that year, Dunning won the Terry Hetherington Young Writers Award with her short story 'Cartref'. Her debut poetry collection, Salacia, followed in 2018. Published by Parthian Books, Salacia was later shortlisted for the 2019 Wales Book of the Year. In an interview with The Cardiff Review, Dunning revealed that the collection "is filled with poems centred on my own experiences, mental health, and narrative poems in the voices of various women whose stories I was completely compelled to tell. I like to get inside a person’s head and let the writing stem from there."

Publications

Fiction 

 Percy the Pom Pom Bear (2016)

Poetry 

 The Wrong Side of the Looking Glass (with Natalie Ann Holborow) (2020)
Salacia (2018)

References

External links
Official website
Feature on Mari Ellis Dunning in The Crunch magazine

1993 births
Living people
20th-century Welsh people
20th-century Welsh women
21st-century Welsh poets
21st-century Welsh women writers
21st-century Welsh writers
People from Aberystwyth
Welsh women poets
Alumni of Aberystwyth University
Welsh children's writers
British women children's writers